The 17th Toronto International Film Festival (TIFF) took place in Toronto, Ontario, Canada between September 10 and September 19, 1992. Léolo was selected as the opening film.

Quentin Tarantino's debut film Reservoir Dogs premiered at the festival and won FIPRESCI International Critics' Award.

Awards

Programme

Gala Presentation
Bad Lieutenant by Abel Ferrara
Bob Roberts by Tim Robbins
The Crying Game by Neil Jordan
The Dark Side of the Heart by Eliseo Subiela
Glengarry Glen Ross by James Foley
Hard Boiled by John Woo
Husbands and Wives by Woody Allen
Laws of Gravity by Nick GomezLéolo by Jean-Claude LauzonLike Water for Chocolate by Alfonso AráuEl mariachi by Robert RodriguezMr. Saturday Night by Billy CrystalOf Mice and Men by Gary SinisePassion Fish by John SaylesPeter's Friends by Kenneth BranaghThe Public Eye by Howard FranklinReservoir Dogs by Quentin TarantinoA River Runs Through It by Robert RedfordSarafina! by Darrell RoodtSimple Men by Hal HartleyStrictly Ballroom by Baz LuhrmannZebrahead by Anthony Drazan

Canadian PerspectiveBeing at Home with Claude by Jean BeaudinBlue by Don McKellarBuried on Sunday by Paul DonovanCareful by Guy MaddinColeslaw Warehouse by Bruce McCullochThe Fairy Who Didn't Want to Be a Fairy Anymore by Laurie LyndForbidden Love: The Unashamed Stories of Lesbian Lives by Lynne Fernie and Aerlyn WeissmanGerda by Brenda LongfellowGiant Steps by Richard RoseHurt Penguins by Robert Bergman and Myra FriedImpolite by David HaukaLetters of Transit (Les sauf-conduits) by Manon BriandMontreal Stories (Montréal vu par...) by Denys Arcand, Michel Brault, Atom Egoyan, Jacques Leduc, Léa Pool and Patricia RozemaManufacturing Consent by Mark Achbar and Peter WintonickMoose Jaw: There's a Future in Our Past by Rick HancoxMy Niagara by Helen LeeRequiem for a Handsome Bastard (Requiem pour un beau sans-coeur) by Robert MorinLa Sarrasine by Paul TanaStepping Razor: Red X by Nicholas CampbellTectonic Plates by Peter MettlerThe Twist by Ron Mann

Midnight MadnessBack to the USSR - takaisin Ryssiin by Jari HalonenBraindead by Peter JacksonCandyman by Bernard RoseMan Bites Dog by Benoît Poelvoorde, Rémy Belvaux & André BonzelRomper Stomper by Geoffrey WrightSwordsman II by Ching Siu-tungTetsuo II: Body Hammer by Shinya TsukamotoTokyo Decadence by Ryu Murakami

DocumentariesBaraka by Ron FrickeFemale Misbehavior by Monika TreutManufacturing Consent: Noam Chomsky and the Media'' by Peter Wintonick & Mark Achbar

References

External links
 Official site
 TIFF: A Reel History: 1976 - 2012
1992 Toronto International Film Festival at IMDb

1992
1992 film festivals
1992 in Toronto
1992 in Canadian cinema